Universal Academy (UA) is a charter school in western Detroit, Michigan, serving grades K-12.

In April 2016 the school sacked eight teachers without prior notification or rationale.

See also
 List of public school academy districts in Michigan

References

External links
 Universal Academy

Charter schools in Michigan
High schools in Detroit